Witch tower or Witches' Tower is a common name or description in English and other European languages for a tower that was part of a medieval town wall or castle, often used as a prison or dungeon.

History 
The name is derived from the period of witch trials. Many of these towers were used  to incarcerate those suspected or found guilty of witchcraft.

Other witch towers were, however, named later, for example in the 19th century when they were simply used as normal prisons or were just ordinary towers in the city walls.

Witch towers are found in many German towns and cities such as Aschersleben, Coburg, Frankenberg (Eder), Fulda, Gelnhausen, Geseke, Heidelberg, Herborn, Hofheim am Taunus, Idstein, Jülich, Kaufbeuren, Lahnstein, Landsberg am Lech, Marburg, Markdorf, Memmingen, Olpe, Rheinbach, Rüthen, Treysa, Windecken. Today these towers are sometimes renovated and used to house museums.

According to legend, witches were burnt at the stake at the Witches' Tower at the Wildensteiner Burg. With trials from the region of the Upper Danube valley may be seen in the archives.

In Babenhausen, a special beer, the Hexe ("Witch") is brewed which depicts on its label the local witch tower.

In Salzburg there is a witch tower in the city walls dating to the 15th century that was used as a prison and, later, as a store. In 1944 it was destroyed by a bomb and the ruins were torn down. Only a picture on the facade of Wolf Dietrich Straße and Paris Lodron Straße recalls this building.

Surviving witch towers 
 Großes Bollwerk and Hexenturm (Büdingen)
 Hexenturm (Burg)
 Hexenturm (Calbe)
 Hexenturm (Fulda)
 Hexenturm in the Old Gaol at Freising
 Hexenturm (Gelnhausen)
 Hexenturm (Herborn)
Hexenturm (Hofheim am Taunus)
 Hexenturm (Idstein), part of Idstein Castle
 Hexenturm Jülich
 Hexenturm (Memmingen)
 Hexenturm (Oberderdingen)
 Hexenturm (Rüthen)
 Hexenturm (Sarnen)
 Hexenturm (Stein am Rhein)
 Baszta Czarownic (Słupsk)

Lost witch towers 
 Hexenturm (Munich), a tower in Munich's second city wall
 Hexenturm (Salzburg), tower in the former city wall, today on the corner of Paris-Lodron-Straße and Wolf-Dietrich Straße

Other buildings with the name 
 Wildensteiner Burg Hexenturm

Gallery

External links 

 Aufsatz zu Justiz und Erinnerung

!
Fortified towers by type
Witch hunting